Arclid is a village and civil parish in the unitary authority of Cheshire East and the ceremonial county of  Cheshire, England.  It is about two miles east of Sandbach and five miles west of Congleton.  The parish had a population of 199 according to the 2001 census, increasing to 276 at the 2011 census.

Landmarks

The village pub, the Legs of Man, is situated on the Newcastle Road. A pub of the same name has stood here since the late 1860s, but the present building dates from 1939 and was designed by J. H. Walters. Originally the pub had a thatched roof, similar to the Bleeding Wolf at Scholar Green, but this caught fire in 1956 and was replaced with tiles. Today it has a mock-Tudor exterior and houses a separate restaurant. There is a large beer garden.

The three-storey Arclid Hall Farmhouse on Hemingshaw Lane is a Grade II listed building, dating from about 1700, with red Flemish bond brick with a slate roof (originally stone slates). It has a nearly symmetrical five-bay front.  It is the only building in the civil parish to be listed by English Heritage.

The village at one time had an active airfield.

Notes

External links

Villages in Cheshire
Civil parishes in Cheshire